Horner House may refer to:

in the United States (by state)
Sidney H. Horner House, Helena, Arkansas, listed on the National Register of Historic Places (NRHP)
Imre and Maria Horner House, Beverly Shores, Indiana, listed on the National Register of Historic Places in Porter County, Indiana
 Horner–Terrill House, Indianapolis, Indiana, USA; an NRHP listed house
Horner House (Louisville, Kentucky), listed on the National Register of Historic Places in Jefferson County, Kentucky
Horner House (Toms River, New Jersey), listed on the National Register of Historic Places in Ocean County, New Jersey
Horner Houses, Burlington, North Carolina, listed on the National Register of Historic Places in Alamance County, North Carolina
Horner House and Barn, Cumberland Township, Pennsylvania, NRHP-listed
Horner-Hyde House, Pierre, South Dakota, NRHP-listed
Druin-Horner House, near Richmond, Virginia, NRHP-listed
John Scott Horner House, Ripon, Wisconsin, listed on the National Register of Historic Places in Fond du Lac County, Wisconsin

See also

 
 Horner (disambiguation)
 House (disambiguation)